Pabitra Rabha (born 31 January 1976) is an Indian actor, who works in Assamese, Hindi, Bangla and English language films.

Early life
Pabitra Rabha was born on 31 January 1976 in Tangla, Udalguri district of Assam.

Filmography

Awards
 "Ustad Bismillah Khan Yuva Puraskar" (2011)

 "Pratima Baruah Pandey Award" (2020)

References

External links 
 
 
 

Assamese actors
Male actors in Hindi cinema
Assamese-language actors
Indian male film actors
People from Udalguri district
Living people
1976 births